Since the inception of the Victorian Football League in 1897, many of its players have served in the armed services, including the Anglo–Boer War, World War I, World War II, the Korean War (in which Melbourne's Geoff Collins served as a fighter pilot), and the Vietnam War (in which Essendon's Keith Gent, Lindsay McGie, and Ian Payne, and Geelong's Wayne Closter all served).

A number of the VFL players who served also lost their lives on active service; they were either killed in action, or died as a consequence of the wounds, injuries, and/or illnesses they had suffered in their active service.

According to Main & Allen (2002, p. x), "no VFL footballer was killed in any wars other than the Anglo–Boer War and the two World Wars".

Anglo-Boer War
Charlie Moore and Stan Reid, the only two VFL players to be killed in the Anglo–Boer War, had played against each other in the 1898 VFL Grand Final.

Reid had played in the back pocket for Fitzroy and was one of Fitzroy's best players, whilst Moore had played at full-forward for Essendon. Fitzroy won the match 5.8 (38) to 3.5 (23), with Moore kicking one of Essendon's three goals.

Moore had already played a number of senior games for Albert-Park Football Club (and, possibly, also for the South Melbourne Football Club) in the VFA before moving to play for Essendon in the VFL's inaugural year of 1897, whilst Stan Reid had played quite a number of senior games for the Fitzroy Football Club in the VFA prior to 1897.

World War I
It can never be definitively argued that any particular person was "the first VFL footballer killed in the First World War" due to at least six former VFL footballers being killed during the chaos of the landing at Anzac Cove on Sunday, 25 April 1915 – Lieutenant Joseph Rupert "Rupert" Balfe (University), Private Joseph Alan "Alan" Cordner (Geelong and Collingwood), Private Claude Terrell Crowl (St Kilda), Private Charles "Charlie" Fincher (South Melbourne), Private Fenley John "Fen" McDonald (Carlton and Melbourne), and Corporal Arthur Mueller "Joe" Pearce (Melbourne).

World War II

Umpires 
At least one VFL umpire is known to have been killed: goal umpire Alexander Salton who served as a Private in the 60th Battalion, First A.I.F. He died from his wounds on 10 September 1916 in France. He was shot in the stomach five days after joining his battalion, which had been comprehensively defeated two months before at the Battle of Fromelles. He is the only VFL field, boundary, or goal umpire known to have been killed on active service in any war.

In an unusual case, one VFL umpire, Henry James "Bunny" Nugent (1880–1955), served in three wars: the Boer War, World War I (wherein he was awarded the Military Cross for his bravery), and World War II (he had put his age back five years to enlist in 1939). In his first senior VFL match as field umpire back from his service in the First AIF (Richmond v. Essendon on Saturday, 11 May 1918), the Richmond and Essendon players lined up and formed a guard of honour for him to run through as he took the ground.

Footnotes

See also 
 The VFL during the World Wars

References 
 Batchelder, A., Melbourne Cricket Club Roll of Honour (1914–1918), Melbourne Cricket Club, 1998.
 Hogan P: The Tigers of Old, Richmond FC, (Melbourne), 1996. 
 Main, J. & Allen, D., Fallen – The Ultimate Heroes: Footballers Who Never Returned From War, Crown Content, (Melbourne), 2002. 
 Maplestone, M., Flying Higher: History of the Essendon Football Club 1872–1996, Essendon Football Club, (Melbourne), 1996. 
 Ross, J. (ed), 100 Years of Australian Football 1897–1996: The Complete Story of the AFL, All the Big Stories, All the Great Pictures, All the Champions, Every AFL Season Reported, Viking, (Ringwood), 1996.

External links
 The official Australian War Memorial Web site
 AFL Player Statistics
 AFL Player Statistics (Round by Round)
 Mick O'Regan, "Lest We Forget - Sport and War", ABC Radio, 19 April  2002. (transcript)
 Chronology: A year by year summary of our history (Melbourne Football Club)
 Alan Grant, "Lest We Forget - Part 1" (St Kilda Football Club Official Website, 19 April 2007)
 Alan Grant, "Lest We Forget - Part 2" (St Kilda Football Club Official Website, 19 April 2007)

Died on active service
History of Australia (1901–1945)
Australian people of World War I
Australian people of World War II
Lists of Australian military personnel
Lists of people killed in World War I
History of Australian rules football
Australian rules football-related lists
Lists of people killed in World War II